Homenmen is a pan-Armenian sports and scouting organization.

Homenmen may also refer to:

Homenmen Beirut, a multi-sports club based in Beirut, Lebanon
Erebuni-Homenmen FC, formerly Homenmen-FIMA FC, a football club based in Yerevan, Armenia

See also
HMM (disambiguation)
Homenetmen (disambiguation)